Beatrice Elachi is a Kenyan politician who currently serves as the member of parliament for Dagoretti North constituency. Prior, she served as Speaker of the Nairobi County Assembly from 6 September 2017 until her resignation on 11 August 2020. As Speaker of the Nairobi County Assembly, she replaced Alex Ole Magelo, who did not contest his seat. Immediately prior to her election, she was the Majority Whip in the Kenya Senate.

Background and education
She was born in Kakamega in a family with four children. She attended St. Teresa’s Primary School for her elementary education. She then transferred to Moi Girls Vokoli High School, in Vihiga County, for he secondary education. She was then admitted to Africa Nazarene University in Nairobi, the capital and largest city in Kenya. She graduated with a Bachelor of Arts degree in Peace and Security Studies. She went on to obtain a Master of Arts degree in the same subject, also from Africa Nazarene University.

Career before politics
Prior to 2003, Beatrice worked as a Programs Officer for the United Nations Program for Women (UN Women), in collaboration with the National Council of Women of Kenya and the Collaborative Centre for Gender and Development. She worked as a trainer of women parliamentarians, in collaboration with the  United Nations Program for Women, between 2003 and 2010. From 2010 until 2013, she served as the Secretary General of the Alliance Party of Kenya.

Political career

In 2013, Beatrice Elachi was nominated to the Senate as a member of The National Alliance (TNA). She rose to the rank of Majority Chief Whip in the Upper Chamber, the first woman to serve in that capacity, in the history of Kenya's parliament.

In 2017, Beatrice won the Jubilee Alliance primary elections in the Dagoretti North Constituency, in April. In the August 2017 general election, she lost to Paul Simba Arati, the incumbent.

On 6 September 2017, having been dully nominated, she was elected speaker of the Nairobi County Assembly, and was the incumbent, as of January 2018.

On 6 September 2018, after being accused of (a) conflict of interest, (b) undermining the Authority of the County Assembly Board, (c) abuse of office, gross misconduct and failure to show leadership, she was impeached as the speaker of Nairobi County Assembly.

On 11 August 2020 Beatrice Elachi resigned as Nairobi County Speaker, in a televised address, citing death threats directed towards her.

Family
Beatrice Elachi is a married mother of four children.

See also
 Polycarp Igathe
 Counties of Kenya
 Local authorities of Kenya

References

External links
Swimming pool a must for city Speaker’s house As of 7 January 2018.

1970s births
Living people
Local politicians in Kenya
People from Nairobi
People from Kakamega County
21st-century Kenyan women politicians
21st-century Kenyan politicians
Members of the Senate of Kenya
Africa Nazarene University alumni
Members of the 12th Parliament of Kenya
Members of the 13th Parliament of Kenya